Kyle J. Martin (born November 13, 1992) is an American professional baseball first baseman who is a free agent. He was drafted by the Philadelphia Phillies in the fourth round of the 2015 Major League Baseball draft, and played in the 2015 WBSC Premier12.

Career

Amateur career
Martin attended Wade Hampton High School in Greenville, South Carolina. He enrolled at the University of South Carolina and played college baseball for the South Carolina Gamecocks. The Los Angeles Angels of Anaheim selected Martin in the 20th round of the 2014 MLB draft, but he did not sign with the Angels, opting to return to South Carolina for his senior year. As a senior, Louisville Slugger named Martin a Second Team All-American.

Philadelphia Phillies
The Philadelphia Phillies selected Martin in the fourth round of the 2015 Major League Baseball (MLB) draft, and he signed with the Phillies. After signing, he was assigned to the Lakewood BlueClaws where he posted a .279 batting average with five home runs and 37 RBIs. 

In 2016, Martin played for the Clearwater Threshers where he batted .250 with 19 home runs and 82 RBIs. In 2017, he played with the Reading Fightin Phils where he batted .193 with 22 home runs and 68 RBIs. In 2018, with the Reading Fightin Phils and the Clearwater Threshers, he batted .198 with 10 home runs and 45 RBIs. Martin was released from the Phillies organization on May 28, 2019.

Winnipeg Goldeyes
On June 5, 2019, Martin signed with the Winnipeg Goldeyes of the American Association of Independent Professional Baseball. On January 28, 2020, Martin re-signed with Winnipeg. He led the league in RBIs with 51, while also belting 16 home runs in 60 games. He was named an American Association All-Star for the 2020 season.

On January 20, 2021, Martin again re-signed with the Goldeyes. He repeated as the league leader in RBIs with 106 and second in home runs with 31, which were both single-season franchise records for Winnipeg. He also earned a second-consecutive All-Star selection.

Guerreros de Oaxaca
On December 20, 2021, Martin's contract was purchased by the Guerreros de Oaxaca of the Mexican League. In 39 games, he batted .364/.480/.884 with a league-leading 18 home runs and 47 RBIs. Martin also led all of professional baseball with a 1.365 OPS prior to his departure from the team.

San Diego Padres
On June 8, 2022, the San Diego Padres signed Martin to a minor league contract and assigned him to the El Paso Chihuahuas. He elected free agency on November 10, 2022.

References

External links

1992 births
Living people
American expatriate baseball players in Canada
American expatriate baseball players in Mexico
Baseball first basemen
Baseball players from South Carolina
Clearwater Threshers players
Guerreros de Oaxaca players
Lakewood BlueClaws players
Reading Fightin Phils players
South Carolina Gamecocks baseball players
Sportspeople from Greenville, South Carolina
United States national baseball team players
Winnipeg Goldeyes players
2015 WBSC Premier12 players